Coenaculum secundum is a species of sea snail, a marine gastropod mollusk in the family Cimidae. The species is one of four known species to exist within the genus Coenaculum, with the other species being Coenaculum minutulum, Coenaculum tertium and Coenaculum weerdtae.

Distribution
This marine species is endemic to New Zealand.

References

Cimidae
Gastropods of New Zealand
Gastropods described in 1937